Frederick Creek is a stream in Wright County, in the U.S. state of Minnesota.

Frederick Creek was named for an early settler.

See also
List of rivers of Minnesota

References

Rivers of Minnesota
Rivers of Wright County, Minnesota